Tony Askew, known by most as Tosh, was coach of the England under 19's rugby union team. He lives in Stoke-on-Trent.

He has taken the English under 19's to a grand slam victory in 2005 and the semi-final place in the world cup.

He was previously a rugby coach and part-time English teacher at a Newcastle-under-Lyme School. During the 1980s Tosh was at St Mary's College Crosby, Merseyide where he was Games Master. During this period he played his rugby for Liverpool St. Helens at full back.

Tosh Ashkew is once again with Newcastle-under-Lyme School working as a part-time coach. He also coaches local youngsters in and around Stoke-on-Trent such as with Eccleshall R.F.C.

References 
 Tosh Askew

Tosh now coaches Cus Genova Rugby, in Italy.

Year of birth missing (living people)
Living people
English rugby union coaches
Sportspeople from Stoke-on-Trent